DocWest is the name of The Centre for Production and Research of Documentary Film at The University of Westminster, London. Established in 2009, it brings together an interdisciplinary network of researchers, practitioners and students to foster creative conversations about documentary practice. In its premises in Central London it hosts a range of screenings, master-classes and conferences involving practitioners in today’s documentary world.

DocWest activities include teaching, film production, and academic research in documentary discourse, its history and its connection to art and politics. Particular attention is given to the study areas of Visual Anthropology and Human Rights, Arts Documentary and the Documentary Archive, whilst extending the range of production and research into other fields of documentary study, such as the interactive documentary and the web-based documentary.

DocWest has developed a PhD programme, with both theoretical and practice-based doctoral degrees focusing on a variety of contexts and referencing many different documentary traditions.

Recent projects include the film The Act of Killing and Arts on Film Archive and the book Killer Images  published by Columbia University Press. The most recent project, the film The Act of Killing, was part of a major UK Arts and Humanities Research Council (AHRC) research project, directed by Prof Joram ten Brink, the director of DocWest, and Joshua Oppenheimer, the director of the film.

Errol Morris' reaction to the film was “Every now and then a non-fiction film comes along that is unlike anything else I have seen: Buñuel’s LAND WITHOUT BREAD, Werner Herzog’s FATA MORGANA, Hara’s THE EMPEROR’S NAKED ARMY MARCHES ON. Well, it’s happened again. Here, Joshua Oppenheimer invites unrepentant Indonesian death-squad leaders to make fiction films re-enacting their violent histories. Their cinematic dreams dissolve into nightmares and then into bitter reality. Like all great documentary, THE ACT OF KILLING demands another way of looking at reality. It is like a hall of mirrors––the so-called mise-en-abyme––where real people become characters in a movie and then jump back into reality again. And it asks the central question: what is real? Gabriel Garcia Marquez, in a Paris Review interview, wrote about reading Kafka’s “Metamorphosis” for the first time, “I didn’t know you were allowed to do that.” I have the same feeling with this extraordinary film,” and Werner Herzog reacted “THE ACT OF KILLING invents a new form of cinematic surrealism.”

References

Documentary film organizations
University of Westminster